Thomas Lemke may refer to:
 Thomas Lemke (sociologist)
 Thomas Lemke (serial killer)